Conus daphne is a species of sea snail, a marine gastropod mollusk in the family Conidae, the cone snails and their allies.

Like all species within the genus Conus, these snails are predatory and venomous. They are capable of "stinging" humans, therefore live ones should be handled carefully or not at all.

Description
The size of the shell varies between 23 mm and 52 mm.

Distribution
This marine species occurs off Eastern Indonesia..

References

 Filmer R.M. (2011) Taxonomic review of the Conus spectrum, Conus stramineus and Conus collisus complexes (Gastropoda - Conidae) - Part I. Visaya 3(2): 23-85.
 Puillandre N., Duda T.F., Meyer C., Olivera B.M. & Bouchet P. (2015). One, four or 100 genera? A new classification of the cone snails. Journal of Molluscan Studies. 81: 1-23

External links
 To USNM Invertebrate Zoology Mollusca Collection
 To World Register of Marine Species
 

daphne
Gastropods described in 1864